John Grigg may refer to:

John Grigg (astronomer) (1838–1920), New Zealand astronomer 
John Grigg (New Zealand politician) (1828–1901)
John Grigg (writer) (1924–2001), British writer, politician, and disclaimed peer

See also
Jonathan Grigg, British medical doctor and professor
John Griggs (disambiguation)